George John Sackville-West, 5th Earl de la Warr, PC (26 October 1791 – 23 February 1869), styled Viscount Cantelupe until 1795, was a British courtier and Tory politician.

Background
Sackville-West was the son of John West, 4th Earl De La Warr and Catherina Lyell, daughter of Henry Lyell, a naturalized British subject (born Henrik Leijel of the Swedish noble family Leijel, nr. 1531). He succeeded his father in the earldom in 1795 at the age of three.

Political career
Lord De La Warr served as Lord Chamberlain of the Household under Sir Robert Peel between 1841 and 1846 and under Lord Derby between 1858 and 1859. He was sworn of the Privy Council in 1841.

Family
Lord De La Warr married Lady Elizabeth Sackville, daughter of John Sackville, 3rd Duke of Dorset, on 21 June 1813. They had ten children, nine of whom lived into maturity:

 George West, Viscount Cantelupe (1814–1850), Member of Parliament for Helston and Lewes, died unmarried.
 Charles Sackville-West, 6th Earl De La Warr (1815–1873).
 Reginald Sackville, 7th Earl De La Warr (1817–1896).
 Lady Elizabeth Sackville-West (1818–1897), married Francis Russell, 9th Duke of Bedford and had issue.
 Mortimer Sackville-West, 1st Baron Sackville (1820–1888).
 [a son] (1822–1823)
 Lady Mary Catherine (1824–1900), married firstly, James Gascoyne-Cecil, 2nd Marquess of Salisbury and had issue. She married secondly, Edward Stanley, 15th Earl of Derby.
 Lionel Sackville-West, 2nd Baron Sackville (1827–1908).
 William Sackville-West (1830–1905), married Georgina Dodwell and had issue, including Lionel Sackville-West, 3rd Baron Sackville.
 Lady Arabella Diana Sackville-West (1835–1869), married Sir Alexander Bannerman, 9th Baronet.

References

"The Peerage and Baronetage of the British Empire as at Present Existing,..." by Edmund Lodge, 1892, p. 179

External links

1791 births
1869 deaths
5
George
George Sackville-West, 05 Earl De La Warr
Members of the Privy Council of the United Kingdom
English people of Swedish descent